Ivelin Giro is a Cuban American actress best known for her role as Viviana Altamira de Rincón in the Spanish language telenovela ¿Dónde está Elisa?.

She appeared in the films Bad Boys II and Hey DJ, as well as the telenovela Valeria.

References

External links
 
 

American film actresses
American television actresses
American entertainers of Cuban descent
Living people
1970 births
21st-century American women